Mohammadreza Ghavidel also known as Aydin Ghavidel (born 19 December 1993) is an Iranian professional football player currently playing for Malavan in the Iran Pro League.

Club career

Malavan 
Mohammadreza has been in Malavan F.C. since he had just started playing football. He joined the main team in 2014. Malavan's coach that year was Dragan Skočić.He has spent one year as soldier-football player in Malavan Novin.

National team 
He was one of five goalkeepers on Iran's U 23 national team for 2016 Summer Olympics.

References 

1993 births
Living people
Iranian footballers
Malavan players
Sportspeople from Gilan province
Association football goalkeepers